The 1976 All-Ireland Senior Hurling Championship Final was the 89th All-Ireland Final and the culmination of the 1976 All-Ireland Senior Hurling Championship, an inter-county hurling tournament for the top teams in Ireland. The match was held at Croke Park, Dublin, on 5 September 1976, between Cork and Wexford. The Leinster champions lost to their Munster opponents on a score line of 2-21 to 4-11.

Match details

References

All-Ireland Senior Hurling Championship Final
All-Ireland Senior Hurling Championship Final, 1976
All-Ireland Senior Hurling Championship Final
All-Ireland Senior Hurling Championship Finals
Cork county hurling team matches
Wexford GAA matches